Megachile aurifacies is a species of bee in the family Megachilidae. It was described by Pasteels in 1985.

References

Aurifacies
Insects described in 1985